This is a list of species in the genus Phytomyza.

Phytomyza species

 Phytomyza aconiti Hendel, 1920  (larkspur leafminer)
 Phytomyza affinalis Frost, 1924
 Phytomyza agromyzina Meigen, 1830
 Phytomyza alamedensis Spencer, 1981
 Phytomyza alaskana Griffiths, 1974
 Phytomyza albiceps Meigen, 1830
 Phytomyza aldrichi Spencer, 1986
 Phytomyza alpina Groschke, 1957
 Phytomyza anemonivora Spencer, 1969
 Phytomyza angelicae Kaltenbach, 1874
 Phytomyza anserimontis Griffiths, 1976
 Phytomyza aquilegiana Frost, 1930  (columbine leafminer)
 Phytomyza aquilegioides Sehgal, 1971
 Phytomyza aquilegiophaga Spencer, 1969
 Phytomyza aquilegivora Spencer, 1969  (columbine leafminer)
 Phytomyza aquilonia Frey, 1946
 Phytomyza aralivora Spencer, 1969
 Phytomyza archangelicae Hering, 1937
 Phytomyza arnicae Hering, 1925
 Phytomyza arnicicola Lundqvist, 1949
 Phytomyza arnicivora Sehgal, 1971
 Phytomyza asterophaga Spencer, 1969
 Phytomyza astotinensis Griffiths, 1976
 Phytomyza atricornis Meigen, 1838
 Phytomyza atripalpis Aldrich, 1929
 Phytomyza aurata Griffiths, 1974
 Phytomyza auricornis Frost, 1927
 Phytomyza banffensis Spencer, 1969
 Phytomyza beringiana Griffiths, 1975
 Phytomyza bicolor Coquillett, 1902
 Phytomyza boulderella Spencer, 1986
 Phytomyza californica Griffiths, 1974
 Phytomyza campestris Griffiths, 1974
 Phytomyza canadensis Spencer, 1969
 Phytomyza carbonensis Spencer, 1981
 Phytomyza cearothi Spencer, 1986
 Phytomyza chaerophylli Kaltenbach, 1856
 Phytomyza chelonei Spencer, 1969
 Phytomyza cicutella Spencer, 1981
 Phytomyza ciliolati Spencer, 1969
 Phytomyza clematidophoeta Spencer, 1969
 Phytomyza clematiphaga Spencer, 1969
 Phytomyza clematisana Spencer, 1981
 Phytomyza clematisella Spencer, 1986
 Phytomyza clematoides Spencer, 1986
 Phytomyza cnidii Griffiths, 1973
 Phytomyza coloradella Spencer, 1986
 Phytomyza columbiana Griffiths, 1977
 Phytomyza columbinae Sehgal, 1971
 Phytomyza conioselini Griffiths, 1973
 Phytomyza coquilletti Spencer, 1986
 Phytomyza crassiseta Zetterstedt, 1860
 Phytomyza crepidis (Spencer, 1981)
 Phytomyza davisii (Walton, 1912)
 Phytomyza delphinivora Spencer, 1969
 Phytomyza demissa Spencer, 1969
 Phytomyza despinosa Griffiths, 1976
 Phytomyza ditmani Kulp, 1968
 Phytomyza dreisbachi Steyskal, 1972
 Phytomyza duplex Spencer, 1986
 Phytomyza edmontonensis Sehgal, 1971
 Phytomyza erigerophila Hering, 1927
 Phytomyza evansi Spencer, 1986
 Phytomyza felix Spencer, 1981
 Phytomyza flavens Spencer, 1986
 Phytomyza flaviantennalis Spencer, 1981
 Phytomyza flavicornis Fallen, 1823
 Phytomyza flavinervis Frost, 1924
 Phytomyza flexuosa Spencer, 1986
 Phytomyza fricki 
 Phytomyza gelida Spencer, 1969
 Phytomyza genalis Melander, 1913
 Phytomyza glabricola Kulp, 1968  (inkberry holly leafminer)
 Phytomyza hebronensis Spencer, 1969
 Phytomyza hellebori Kaltenbach, 1872
 Phytomyza horticola Goureau, 1851
 Phytomyza humilis Spencer, 1969
 Phytomyza hyperborea Griffiths, 1972
 Phytomyza hypophylla Griffiths, 1972
 Phytomyza ilicicola Loew, 1872  (native holly leafminer)
 Phytomyza ilicis Curtis, 1846  (European holly leafminer)
 Phytomyza infelix Spencer, 1969
 Phytomyza integerrimi Griffiths, 1974
 Phytomyza jasperensis Sehgal, 1971
 Phytomyza lactuca Frost, 1924
 Phytomyza lanati Spencer, 1966
 Phytomyza latifrons Spencer, 1986
 Phytomyza leptargyreae 
 Phytomyza leslieae 
 Phytomyza ligusticifoliae Spencer, 1981
 Phytomyza linnaeae 
 Phytomyza loewii Hendel, 1923
 Phytomyza lugentis Griffiths, 1972
 Phytomyza lupini Sehgal, 1968
 Phytomyza lupinivora Sehgal, 1968
 Phytomyza luteiceps Sehgal, 1971
 Phytomyza major Malloch, 1913
 Phytomyza malaca Spencer, 1981
 Phytomyza manni Spencer, 1986
 Phytomyza masoni Spencer, 1986
 Phytomyza melanella Frost, 1924
 Phytomyza mertensiae Sehgal, 1971
 Phytomyza minuscula Goureau, 1851
 Phytomyza minutissima Spencer, 1981
 Phytomyza miranda Spencer, 1969
 Phytomyza misella Spencer, 1969
 Phytomyza modica Spencer, 1969
 Phytomyza modocensis Spencer, 1981
 Phytomyza montereyensis Spencer, 1981
 Phytomyza multifidae Sehgal, 1971
 Phytomyza nagvakensis Spencer, 1969
 Phytomyza nepetae Hendel, 1922
 Phytomyza nervosa Loew, 1869
 Phytomyza nigra Meigen, 1830
 Phytomyza nigrinervis Frost, 1924
 Phytomyza nigripennis Fallen, 1823
 Phytomyza notopleuralis Spencer, 1969
 Phytomyza oenanthoides Spencer, 1981
 Phytomyza omlandi Scheffer, 2011
 Phytomyza opacae Kulp, 1968
 Phytomyza oreas Griffiths, 1974
 Phytomyza orindensis Spencer, 1981
 Phytomyza orlandensis Spencer
 Phytomyza osmorhizae Spencer, 1969
 Phytomyza ovalis Griffiths, 1975
 Phytomyza ovimontis Griffiths, 1976
 Phytomyza oxytropidis Sehgal, 1971
 Phytomyza pallipes Spencer, 1969
 Phytomyza parvicella (Coquillett, 1902)
 Phytomyza pastinacae Hendel, 1923
 Phytomyza pedicularicaulis Spencer, 1969
 Phytomyza pedicularidis Spencer, 1969
 Phytomyza penstemonella Spencer, 1981
 Phytomyza penstemonis Spencer, 1969
 Phytomyza peregrini Griffiths, 1976
 Phytomyza periclymeni Hendel, 1922
 Phytomyza persicae Frick, 1954
 Phytomyza petiolaris Griffiths, 1975
 Phytomyza phaceliae Spencer, 1981
 Phytomyza phalangites Griffiths, 1976
 Phytomyza plantaginis Robineau-desvoidy, 1851
 Phytomyza plumiseta Frost, 1924
 Phytomyza prava Spencer, 1969
 Phytomyza pulchella Spencer, 1986
 Phytomyza pullula Zetterstedt, 1848
 Phytomyza queribunda Spencer, 1969
 Phytomyza ranunculi (Schrank, 1803)
 Phytomyza ranunculoides Spencer, 1986
 Phytomyza rhodiolae Griffiths, 1976
 Phytomyza riparia (Sehgal, 1971)
 Phytomyza rostrata Hering, 1934
 Phytomyza rufipes Meigen, 1830
 Phytomyza saniculae Spencer, 1981
 Phytomyza saskatoonensis Spencer
 Phytomyza saxatilis Griffiths, 1974
 Phytomyza saximontana Griffiths, 1974
 Phytomyza scopulina Griffiths, 1976
 Phytomyza sehgali Spencer, 1969
 Phytomyza sitchensis Griffiths, 1973
 Phytomyza solidaginivora Spencer, 1969
 Phytomyza solidaginophaga Sehgal, 1971
 Phytomyza sonorensis Spencer, 1981
 Phytomyza splendida Spencer, 1981
 Phytomyza spondylii Robineau-desvoidy, 1851
 Phytomyza stolonigena Hering, 1949
 Phytomyza subalpina Sehgal, 1971
 Phytomyza subtenella Frost, 1924
 Phytomyza subtilis Spencer, 1969
 Phytomyza superba Spencer, 1969
 Phytomyza symphoricarpi 
 Phytomyza syngenesiae (Hardy, 1849)  (chrysanthemum leafminer)
 Phytomyza tenella Meigen, 1830
 Phytomyza tenuis Spencer, 1969
 Phytomyza thalictrella Spencer, 1981
 Phytomyza thalictrivora Spencer, 1969
 Phytomyza tiarellae Griffiths, 1972
 Phytomyza timida Spencer, 1969
 Phytomyza tlingitica Griffiths, 1973
 Phytomyza trivittata Frost, 1924
 Phytomyza tundrensis Spencer, 1969
 Phytomyza tussilaginis Hendel, 1925
 Phytomyza undescribed-aquilegiae-group 
 Phytomyza urbana Spencer, 1969
 Phytomyza varipes Macquart, 1835
 Phytomyza verticillatae Kulp, 1968
 Phytomyza vomitoriae Kulp, 1968
 Phytomyza wahlgreni Ryden, 1944
 Phytomyza wiggii

References

External links

Phytomyza